Butter bar or butterbar may refer to:

 Second lieutenant, a junior commissioned officer rank in the US Army, Air Force and Marines
 Ensign (rank), a junior rank of a commissioned officer in the US Navy and Coast Guard
 Dessert bar, a type of confection

See also 
 Butter cookie, cookies consisting of butter, flour, and sugar
 Butterstick (disambiguation)
 Butter (disambiguation)